Saint-Michel-de-Feins is a former commune in the Mayenne department in north-western France. On 1 January 2019, it was merged into the new commune Bierné-les-Villages.

See also
Communes of the Mayenne department

References

Saintmicheldefeins